MRDA may refer to:
 Men's Roller Derby Association, the governing body of men's roller derby
 MRDA (slang), 'Mandy Rice-Davies Applies', Internet slang
 Mitsubishi Motors R&D of America (MRDA), a subdivision of Mitsubishi Motors North America
Mongko Region Defence Army

People with the surname
Dragan Mrđa (born 1984), Serbian football player